Labeo barbatus is fish in genus Labeowhich occurs in the Lower and Central Congo River basin.

References 

 

Labeo
Fish described in 1898